Teyl is a genus of spiders in the family Anamidae. It is one of the genera that was placed in the former tribe Teylini (now included in the Anamidae). The type species is T. luculentus.

Description
Species of this genus range from 2 to 10 mm in carapace length.

Species
 it contains seven species:
 Teyl damsonoides (Main, 1983) — Western Australia
 Teyl harveyi Main, 2004 — Victoria
 Teyl heuretes Huey, Rix, Wilson, Hillyer & Harvey, 2019 — Western Australia
 Teyl luculentus Main, 1975 — Western Australia
 Teyl vancouveri (Main, 1985) — Western Australia
 Teyl walkeri Main, 2004 — Victoria
 Teyl yeni Main, 2004 — Victoria

Distribution
The genus occurs in south-western Australia as well as in Eyre Peninsula and western Victoria. Its distribution was likely fragmented in southern Australia during the Cretaceous inundation of central Australia, the radiation of the genus in south-western Australia has probably resulted from the continuing isolation of relictual habitats which have retained aspects of Gondwanan conditions.

Names
The genus name is an Australian Aboriginal word meaning a brightly coloured stone - thus the reference is to the glabrous (shiny) bright texture of the spider's integument.
The specific name luculentus of the type species refers to the shining yellowish colour.
T. harvey is named as a tribute to Mark S. Harvey, T. walkeri after Ken Walker, T. yeni after Alan Yen.

Footnotes

References
 Main, B.Y. (1975): The citrine spider; a new genus of trapdoor spider (Mygalomorphae: Dipluridae). The Western Australian Naturalist 13(4): 73-78.
 Main, Barbara York (2004): Biosystematics of Australian mygalomorph spiders: descriptions of three species of Teyl from Victoria (Araneae: Nemesiidae). Memoirs of Museum Victoria 61(1): 47-55. PDF

Anamidae
Spiders of Australia
Mygalomorphae genera